"Up Went Nelson" was a song by The Go Lucky Four (a group of Belfast school teachers: Gerry Burns, Finbar Carolan, John Sullivan and Eamonn McGirr) that was number one on the Ireland music charts in 1966 for eight consecutive weeks.

It was sung to the tune of "John Brown's Body" and is about the destruction on 8 March 1966 of Nelson's Pillar in Dublin.

See also
Nelson's Farewell

References 

Irish folk songs
1966 songs
Songwriter unknown